Nuclear transcription factor Y subunit gamma is a protein that in humans is encoded by the NFYC gene.

Function 

The protein encoded by this gene is one subunit of a trimeric complex, forming a highly conserved transcription factor that binds with high specificity to CCAAT motifs in the promoter regions in a variety of genes. This gene product, subunit C, forms a tight dimer with the B subunit (NFYB), a prerequisite for subunit A (NFYA) association. The resulting trimer binds to DNA with high specificity and affinity. Subunits B and C each contain a histone-like motif. Observation of the histone nature of these subunits is supported by two types of evidence; protein sequence alignments and experiments with mutants. Additional regulation, preliminarily supported by the EST database, may be represented by alternative splicing in this subunit.

Two microRNAs; miR-30c and miR-30e are located within introns of the nfyc gene.  These microRNAs are actively transcribed in human insulin-producing beta cells in the pancreatic islets that also show high expression of nfyc and CDH1 genes.  The expression of these intronic microRNAs is essential for maintaining the differentiated phenotype of human islet beta cells.  Inhibition of miR-30 family microRNAs induces epithelial-mesenchymal transition of human pancreatic islet cells.

Interactions 

NFYC has been shown to interact with Myc.

References

Further reading

External links 
 

Transcription factors